Babi Kandi (also Romanized as Bābī Kandī; also known as Bā’ī Kandī) is a village in Ojarud-e Shomali Rural District, in the Central District of Germi County, Ardabil Province, Iran. At the 2006 census, its population was 62, in 11 families.

References 

Towns and villages in Germi County